Mimsy may refer to:

 Mimsy, a word introduced by Lewis Carroll in his poem Jabberwocky
 Mimsy Were the Borogoves, a short story partly about the poem
 a nanotechnology object from the future in The Last Mimzy, a 2007 science fiction film, based on the above short story
 nickname of Merle Mimsy Farmer (born 1945), American actress
 nickname of Margaret Mimsy Møller (born 1955), Norwegian press photographer
 Mimsy, a fictional character in the TV series The Secret Life of the American Teenager
 Mimsy, a fictional character in the episodes "Crippled Summer" and "Handicar" of the TV show South Park
 Mimsy Laaz, a fictional character in the anime series Super Dimension Century Orguss

See also 
 
 Mimsie the Cat, the cat in the logo of MTM Enterprises